The Ministry or Board of Revenue was one of the Six Ministries under the Department of State Affairs in imperial China.

Name
The term "Ministry" or "Board of Revenue" is an English gloss of the department's purview. In Chinese, the various names of the department never referred to the government's monetary income. Instead, prior to the Sui dynasty, it was known as the Dùzhī from its role in overseeing government expenses. Under the Sui, it was known as the "Ministry of People" (Mínbù) from its role overseeing the census and its associated taxation. From the Tang to the Qing, it was known as the "Households Department" (Hùbù), again from its role in overseeing a census reckoned in households and its associated taxation.

Administrative level
Tang dynasty & Song dynasty: subordinate to the Department of State Affairs
Yuan dynasty: subordinate to the Secretariat
Ming dynasty: originally subordinate to the Secretariat, relatively autonomous after 1380, coordinated by the Grand Secretariat after the mid-1400s

Functions 
Charles O. Hucker wrote that the Ministry of Revenue was "in general charge of population and land censures, assessment and collection of taxes, and storage and distribution of government revenues." The ministry was usually divided into specialized bureaus:

 Census Bureau (戶部司)
 General Accounts Bureau (度支司)
 Treasury Bureau (金部司)
 Granaries Bureau (倉部司)

Each bureau was headed by a director (郎中). The ministry was headed by a minister (尚書).

See also
 Hoppo

References

Citations

Sources 

 
 "Ministry (Board) of Finance," H.S. Brunnert, V.V. Hagelstrom Present Day Political Organization of China (1912: reprinted: Routledge, 2012), pp. 119–121.

Government of Imperial China
Six Ministries
China
China